Invincible was a first-rate ship of the line of the French Royal Navy.

Built on plans by Francois Guillaume Clairin Deslauriers at Rochefort as part of the French naval mobilisation for the American War of Independence, she was a sister-ship of Royal Louis.

She was built within 13 month and completed in Mai 1780.

American War of Independence
In 1781 stationed at the Antilles, it picked a British concoy.
1782 ordered to Gibraltar, in Lamotte-Picquet's squadron. (Comte de la Motte was her captain 1781/04-1783/04).
She took part in the Battle of Cape Spartel, where she attacked the rear of the British squadron.

She was refitted several time (1781, 1784 and 1795) until her career came to an end in 1807 when she was disarmed and finally broken up in 1808 at Brest. Her replacement was the Commerce de Marseille of 118 guns.

Armament

Armament 1780
Broadside Weight = 1104 French Livre (1191.4368 lbs 540.408 kg)
Lower Gun Deck: 30x French 36-Pounder
Middle Gun Deck: 32x French 24-Pounder
Upper Gun Deck: 30x French 12-Pounder

Armament 1781
Broadside Weight = 1136 French Livre (1225.9712 lbs 556.072 kg)
Lower Gun Deck: 30x French 36-Pounder
Middle Gun Deck: 32x French 24-pound Carronade
Upper Gun Deck: 30x French 12-Pounder
Quarterdeck/Forecastle: 8x French 8-Pounder

Armament 1784
Broadside Weight = 1168 French Livre (1260.5056 lbs 571.736 kg) 
Lower Gun Deck: 30x French 36-Pounder
Middle Gun Deck:32x French 24-Pounder
Upper Gun Deck:30x French 12-Pounder
Quarterdeck/Forecastle:16x French 8-Pounder

Armament 1795
Broadside Weight = 1252 French Livre (1351.1584 lbs 612.854 kg)
Lower Gun Deck: 30x French 36-Pounder
Middle Gun Deck: 32x French 24-Pounder
Upper Gun Deck:32x French 12-Pounder
Quarterdeck/Forecastle: 4x French 36-Pounder Obusier
Quarterdeck/Forecastle1: 6x French 8-Pounder

References
 Dictionnaire de la flotte de guerre française, Jean-Michel Roche
 Nomenclature des Navires Français de 1774 à 1792, Alain Demerliac
 French Warships in the Age of Sail 1786-1861, Rif Winfiled & Stephen S. Roberts

External links
 Invincible 1780 at Threedecks.org
 French site - Vaisseaux de ligne francais de 1682 a 1780
 French site - Troisponts.net

Ships of the line of the French Navy
1780 ships